Səmədabad or Samedabad or Samadabad may refer to:
Səmədabad, Bilasuvar, Azerbaijan
Səmədabad, Goranboy, Azerbaijan
Səmədabad, Yevlakh, Azerbaijan
Samadabad, Fars, Iran
Samadabad, Gilan, Iran
Samadabad, East Azerbaijan, Iran
Samadabad, Razavi Khorasan, Iran
Samadabad, South Khorasan, Iran